Charles Cooke III (born July 1, 1994) is an American professional basketball player who last played for the Sioux Falls Skyforce of the NBA G League. He played college basketball for both James Madison University and the University of Dayton.

High school career
Throughout his high school years, he played basketball at the Trenton Catholic Academy in his home state. In his junior year, he averaged 6.8 points and 0.7 rebounds per game in 23 games played there. During his senior year, he increased his production to 14.1 points and 1.0 rebounds per game in 28 games played. After graduating from high school, he committed to playing for James Madison University at the Colonial Athletic Association.

College career
In his freshman season, he averaged 5.8 points and 2.8 rebounds per game in 32 games played for the Dukes. He improved his production in his sophomore year, averaging 14.3 points, 5.0 rebounds, 1.7 assists, and 1.4 steals per game in 30 games played for James Madison. After his sophomore season, he sat out what would have originally been his junior year to transfer to the University of Dayton at the Atlantic 10 Conference. In his first season at Dayton, Cooke averaged 15.6 points, 5.8 rebounds, 1.8 assists, 1.3 steals, and 1.2 blocks per game in 32 games played. Finally, in his senior year, he averaged 15.8 points, 5.1 rebounds, 2.8 assists, 1.1 steals, and 1.0 blocks per game in 29 games played. During his time at Dayton, he became the only player to have two seasons with averages of 1 assist, 1 steal, and 1 block per game with 37.5% three-point shooting and 5 free-throw attempts per game.

Professional career
While he was originally projected to be a second round pick in the 2017 NBA Draft, he ultimately went undrafted. After the draft, he played with the Minnesota Timberwolves for the 2017 NBA Summer League, with the intent on signing with them afterwards. In the five games he played for the Timberwolves, he recorded 10 points, 3 rebounds, and 1 steal per game in 20.8 minutes of action. Cooke ultimately wouldn't sign a deal with the Timberwolves. Instead, on August 2, 2017, Cooke signed a two-way contract with the New Orleans Pelicans. That meant for the majority of the season, Cooke would split his professional time between the New Orleans squad and a G-League affiliate that's going to be best designated to them by the league before the season begins, which turned out to be the Greensboro Swarm. He made his NBA debut on October 28, 2017, playing in two minutes and scoring two points in a blowout 123–101 win over the Cleveland Cavaliers.

On October 7, 2018, Cooke signed with the Miami Heat. He was waived by the Heat on October 11 after appearing in one preseason game. Cooke was subsequently added to the roster of the Sioux Falls Skyforce. On March 15, 2019, Cooke signed a 10-day contract with the Miami Heat, and was immediately assigned back to the Skyforce.

On August 31, 2019, De' Longhi Treviso of the Italian Lega Basket Serie A (LBA), but released at mid-season, replaced by Ivan Almeida.

After the short Italian stint, Cooke signed in Puerto Rico for the Atléticos de San Germán as first team's import player of the 2020 season.

On June 1, 2021, Cooke signed with the Hamilton Honey Badgers of the Canadian Elite Basketball League.

On February 15, 2022, Cooke was acquired and activated by the Maine Celtics, but was waived on March 2.

NBA career statistics

Regular season 

|-
| style="text-align:left;"|
| style="text-align:left;"|New Orleans
| 13 || 0 || 2.9 || .143 || .125 || .500 || .2 || .1 || .1 || .0 || .5
|- class="sortbottom"
| style="text-align:center;" colspan="2"|Career
| 13 || 0 || 2.9 || .143 || .125 || .500 || .2 || .1 || .1 || .0 || .5

References

External links
James Madison Dukes bio
Dayton Flyers bio

1994 births
Living people
African-American basketball players
American expatriate basketball people in Italy
American men's basketball players
Basketball players from Trenton, New Jersey
Dayton Flyers men's basketball players
Greensboro Swarm players
James Madison Dukes men's basketball players
Lega Basket Serie A players
New Orleans Pelicans players
Pallacanestro Treviso players
Salt Lake City Stars players
Shooting guards
Sioux Falls Skyforce players
Trenton Catholic Academy alumni
Undrafted National Basketball Association players
Universo Treviso Basket players
United States men's national basketball team players
21st-century African-American sportspeople
American expatriate basketball people in Canada